Bezymyanka may refer to:
Bezymyanka (airport)
Bezymyanka - railway station in Samara, Russia
Bezymyanka metro station, a station of the Samara Metro, Samara, Russia
Bezymyanka (village), a village (khutor) in Volgograd Oblast, Russia